Aethesoides distigmatana is a species of moth of the family Tortricidae. It is found on Cuba, St. Croix, St. Vincent and Grenada.

The wingspan is about 9 mm. The forewings are whitish ochreous, with three dark fawn-brown costal spots. The extreme base of the costa is also fawn brown. The hindwings are greyish.

References

Moths described in 1897
Cochylini
Moths of the Caribbean